= Riccardo Rovatti =

Italian engineer

Riccardo Rovatti from the University of Bologna, Bologna, Italy was named Fellow of the Institute of Electrical and Electronics Engineers (IEEE) in 2012 for contributions to nonlinear and statistical signal processing applied to electronic systems.
